Berta M. Roybar Barnhart (born April 1, 1880) was a member of Seattle City Planning Commission.

Early life
Berta M. Roybar Barnhart was born in Ackley, Iowa, on April 1, 1880, the daughter of Frank Roybar and Lucretia Lee.

Career
She was active in club affairs. For seven years she was a church organist. 

She was a member of City Planning Commission. 

She was the president of the City Federation of Women's Clubs.

She was a member of the Coterie Club and of the Women's City Club.

Personal life
Berta R. Barnhart moved to Washington in 1910 and lived at 5722 East Green Lake Way, Seattle, Washington. On April 4, 1906, she married Walter Ernest Barnhart (1877-1931), a city and county attorney elected on Republican ticket, and had three children, Harold Ernest, Marget/Margaret Helen, Marian E.

References

People from Ackley, Iowa
1880 births
Year of death missing